The discography of American R&B/synthpop group The System consists of seven studio albums, fifteen singles and two compilation album.

Formed around the year 1982, the group originally consisted of David Frank and Mic Murphy. It was disbanded in 1989, soon after their fifth studio album Rhythm & Romance came out.

Their most successful singles were "Don't Disturb This Groove" in 1987 and "You Are in My System" in 1983. "Don't Disturb This Groove" peaked at number four on the Billboard Hot 100 and number one on the Hot R&B/Hip-Hop Songs chart. "You Are in My System" peaked at number sixty-four on the Billboard Hot 100 and number ten on the Hot R&B/Hip-Hop Songs chart.

Most of the material were written by band members Mic Murphy and David Frank. However, the soundtrack material was written by different people, most notably "Coming to America" was written by Nile Rodgers.

Albums

Studio albums

Compilation albums

Singles

Music videos

Other appearances

References

External links
 

Discography
System, The
Rhythm and blues discographies
System, The